Stenotrophomonas daejeonensis is an aerobic, Gram-positive and motile bacterium from the genus of Stenotrophomonas which has been isolated from sewage.

References

External links
Type strain of Stenotrophomonas daejeonensis at BacDive -  the Bacterial Diversity Metadatabase

Xanthomonadales
Bacteria described in 2011